Isaac Mekler Neiman (born 9 July 1959) is a Peruvian politician and a former Congressman representing the Constitutional Province of Callao for the 2006–2011 term. Originally from the Peruvian Nationalist Party, Mekler switched to the National Solidarity Party of Luis Castañeda in 2009. In the 2011 elections, he lost his seat he ran for re-election under the National Solidarity Alliance of former Lima Mayor Luis Castañeda but he was not re-elected.

He was the leader of the Association of Jews in Peru as of December 2005.

Education 
He studied at the León Pinelo School in the city of Lima. He later studied the Pontifical Catholic University of Peru, where he studied law.

Political career

Congressman 
Mekler was affiliated with the Peruvian Nationalist Party of Ollanta Humala. In the  2006 elections, he won a seat, representing Constitutional Province of Callao and served for the 2006–2011 term. In 2009, he switched to the National Solidarity Party of Luis Castañeda. In the 2011 elections, he lost his seat he ran for re-election under the National Solidarity Alliance of former Lima Mayor Luis Castañeda but he was not re-elected.

Post-congressional term 
In the 2016 election, he ran for a seat again in Congress, this time switching to the constituency of Lima under the Alliance for the Progress of Peru of former Governor of La Libertad Cesar Acuña Peralta which grouped the Alliance for Progress, National Restoration and We Are Peru, but was once again, he was unsuccessful.

References

Living people
Peruvian Jews
Jewish Peruvian politicians
Peruvian people of German-Jewish descent
Peruvian Nationalist Party politicians
Union for Peru politicians
National Solidarity Party (Peru) politicians
Alliance for Progress (Peru) politicians
Members of the Congress of the Republic of Peru

1959 births
Pontifical Catholic University of Peru alumni
People from Lima